The Center for the Study of Southern Culture (CSSC), located in Barnard Observatory on the University of Mississippi campus in Oxford, Mississippi, is an academic organization dedicated to the investigation, documentation, interpretation and teaching of the Southern United States, including its culture. The CSSC includes the Southern Documentary Project division and the Southern Foodways Alliance institute, and a partner publication, Living Blues magazine. Over the years it has hosted countless programs, including the Oxford Conference for the Book, the Music of the South Concert Series and Symposium, the Gilder-Jordan Lecture in Southern Cultural History, the Blues Today Symposium, and the Southern Documentary Festival. The center supports an undergraduate and graduate Southern Studies academic department, granting Bachelor of Arts, Master of Arts, and Master of Fine Arts degrees. Former directors of the Center include William Ferris, Charles Reagan Wilson, and Ted Ownby. Kathryn McKee is the current director, and James G. Thomas, Jr. and Afton Thomas are the associate directors. CSSC published the award-winning Encyclopedia of Southern Culture and The New Encyclopedia of Southern Culture. In 2014, the CSSC launched the online journal Study the South.

In Barnard Observatory, the center's Gammill Gallery hosts changing exhibits of documentary photography of the American South. Among the many collections permanently housed at the center is the Kenneth S. Goldstein Folklore Collection.

Study the South
Launched in 2014, Study the South is a peer-reviewed multimedia online journal, focusing on the culture of the American South. The academic approach is interdisciplinary, with a particular focus on history, anthropology, sociology, music, literature, documentary studies, gender studies, religion, geography, media studies, race studies, ethnicity, folklife, and art.

Programs and lecture series
 Oxford Conference for the Book
 SouthTalks
 Music of the South Series and Symposium
 Gilder-Jordan Lecture in Southern Cultural History
 Blues Today Symposium
 Southern Documentary Festival

Publications
 Study the South journal
 The Mississippi Encyclopedia
 Living Blues magazine
 The New Encyclopedia of Southern Culture
 Encyclopedia of Southern Culture
 The Southern Register
 The Faulkner & Yoknapatawpha Series

See also
Center for the Study of the American South at the University of North Carolina.

References

External links
Center for the Study of Southern Culture official web site
Gammill Gallery

University of Mississippi
Research institutes in Mississippi
Museums in Lafayette County, Mississippi
History museums in Mississippi